Edward Moss may refer to:

 Edward Moss (impresario) (1852–1912), British theatre manager
 Edward Moss (impersonator) (born 1977), American actor, dancer, comedian, and Michael Jackson impersonator
 Edward Moss (politician) (1856–1916), member of parliament in New Zealand